Konstantin Viktorovich Belkov (born 23 February 1980) is a Russian former professional footballer.

Club career
He made his debut in the Russian Premier League in 1997 for FC Chernomorets Novorossiysk. He played one game in the UEFA Cup 2001–02 for FC Chernomorets Novorossiysk.

References

1980 births
Living people
People from Novorossiysk
Russian footballers
Association football defenders
FC Chernomorets Novorossiysk players
Russian Premier League players
FC Nosta Novotroitsk players
Sportspeople from Krasnodar Krai